The 1933 Chatham Cup was the 11th annual nationwide knockout football competition in New Zealand.

The competition was run on a regional basis, with eight regional associations (Auckland, Walkato, Wellington, Manawatu, Buller, Westland, Canterbury, and Otago) each holding separate qualifying rounds.

Auckland's YMCA entered the cup in late May only to withdraw a week later.

An entry from the Poverty Bay Football Association (PBFA) was withdrawn in late June after a meeting of the executive in Gisborne.

Following the Wellington region semi-final fixture between Waterside v Swifts, a protest from the Swifts in regard to the ineligibility of Waterside player, Baistow was lodged with, and later upheld by the NZFA, the match was replayed as a result.

Maori Hill in mid July expressed concern about the potential travel arrangements and costs if drawn to play its next fixture on the West Coast. 

Teams taking part included: Ponsonby, Tramways (Auckland), Huntly Thistle, Hamilton Wanderers, Rotowaro (Waikato) St. Andrews, Athletic (Manawatu), Woollen Mills (Whanganui), Hospital, Lower Hutt, Wellington Marist, Petone, Swifts, Seatoun, Waterside (Wellington) Linwood, Nomads, Rangers, St. Alban's, Christchurch Thistle, Western, Technical Old Boys (Canterbury) Millerton All Blacks, Denniston Celtic, Thistle (Buller), Dobson, Cobden, Taylorville, Greymouth (Westland) Maori Hill, Northern (Dunedin)

The 1933 final
Ponsonby won their second title, having previously held the cup in 1927. John Morrison and Bob Innes were the only two players to have been in both winning teams. Millerton reached the final for the second consecutive time, but again finished runners-up. In the final, Millerton dominated the first half but were unable to beat the Ponsonby defence. Jack Jepson put the Auckland side up after 20 minutes against the run of play, and Innes doubled the lead before the break through a defensive mistake. In the second spell Tom Pollock pulled a goal back for Millerton, but they were unable to get a second breakthrough, despite having several good chances.

Results

Final

References

Rec.Sport.Soccer Statistics Foundation New Zealand 1933 page

Chatham Cup
Chatham Cup
Chatham Cup